Emerald Station is situated on the Puffing Billy Railway in Victoria, Australia.  It was opened with the Railway on 18 December 1900 and comprised a platform track and a loop siding.  A passing loop was added between the two a few years later. There was also a spur siding off the Down end of No. 3 Road. Two standard 12 ft by 20 ft timber portable station buildings with a Van Goods Shed between (all adjoining) were provided on the platform and a Goods Shed on the No. 3 Road loop siding. Other buildings included Tea Rooms, lamp room and toilets along with a cattle race and loading bank. The station building was later reduced in length by one of the portables which housed the General and Ladies' waiting rooms.

Overview 
Emerald today remains very similar to the early days, but has had other roads added into a carriage workshops, a turntable and storage sidings.  Also, a signal and telegraph branch depot in the form of a large goods shed and a multi-purpose yard building in the form of a locomotive depot administration building have been added.  During 2009, the station building underwent stage one of an internal restoration to its former glory.

External links
 Melway map at street-directory.com.au

Tourist railway stations in Melbourne
Railway stations in the Shire of Yarra Ranges